Stefan Müller (born 8 March 1974) is a German former professional footballer who played as a defender. He spent his entire career with SC Freiburg.

Career
Born in Schopfheim, Müller joined SC Freiburg in 1993, and making his debut the following season as the club went on to finish third in the Bundesliga. He played a further ten seasons for the club, eight of which were at the highest level – Freiburg were relegated in 1997 and 2002, but bounced back immediately on both occasions. In total he made 203 league appearances for the club, scoring 12 times before retiring in 2005. He won six caps for Germany under-21 team in the mid-1990s.

References 

1974 births
Living people
People from Lörrach (district)
Sportspeople from Freiburg (region)
German footballers
Footballers from Baden-Württemberg
Association football defenders
Germany under-21 international footballers
Bundesliga players
2. Bundesliga players
SC Freiburg players